The women's 800 metres at the 2022 European Athletics Championships took place at the Olympiastadion on 18, 19 and 20 August.

Records

Schedule

Results

Round 1
First 3 in each heat (Q) and the next 4 fastest  (q) advance to the Semifinals.

Semifinals
First 3 in each semifinal (Q) and the next 2 fastest (q) advance to the Final.

Final

References

800 W
800 metres at the European Athletics Championships
Euro